Marko Boshnakov (1878 – 1908) was a Bulgarian anarchist, participant in the Macedonian revolutionary movement and a member of the Gemidziite.

Biography 
Boshnakov was born in 1878 in Ohrid, Manastir Vilayet, Ottoman Macedonia. Later he became a member of Gemidziite while studying in the Bulgarian Men's High School of Thessaloniki and participated in the Thesaloniki assassinations.

He rented a shop on the opposite side of the Ottoman Bank in Thessaloniki, since there are foundations he dug a tunnel to the bank and he placed there dynamite. Later in that shop Jordan Popjordanov burned the fuze and bombed the Ottoman Bank. He is one of four Gemidzhii (Pavel Shatev, Georgi Bogdanov and Milan Arsov) who were arrested and brought before a special court.

All four were sentenced to death but his sentence was later commuted to life imprisonment. Marko Boshnakov died on February 15, 1908, in the Libyan province Fezzan. His skull was brought by Satev and Bogdanov in Macedonia. Remains of Marko Boshnakov head ware placed in a decorative wooden catafalque and buried in the cemetery in the church Sv. Virgin Perivlepta.

See also 
 Georgi Bogdanov
 Pavel Shatev

References

External links 

1878 births
1908 deaths
Anarchist assassins
People from Ohrid
People from Manastir vilayet
Bulgarian revolutionaries
Bulgarian anarchists
Macedonian Bulgarians
Bulgarian people imprisoned abroad
Prisoners who died in Ottoman detention
Bulgarian people who died in prison custody
Bulgarian nationalist assassins